This partial list of city nicknames in Puerto Rico compiles the aliases, sobriquets and slogans that cities are known by (or have been known by historically), officially and unofficially, to municipal governments, local people, outsiders or their tourism boards or chambers of commerce. City nicknames can help in establishing a civic identity, helping outsiders recognize a community or attracting people to a community because of its nickname; promote civic pride; and build community unity. Nicknames and slogans that successfully create a new community "ideology or myth" are also believed to have economic value. Their economic value is difficult to measure, but there are anecdotal reports of cities that have achieved substantial economic benefits by "branding" themselves by adopting new slogans.

There are no less than 189 nicknames listed on the Puerto Rico municipalities directory. Some towns or cities or municipalities have a single nickname, some have as many as five.

See also

 List of city nicknames in the United States
 Municipalities of Puerto Rico

References

Puerto Rico cities and towns
Populated places in Puerto Rico
City nicknames
Names of places in the United States
Puerto Rico city nicknames